The enzyme long-chain-enoyl-CoA hydratase catalyzes the chemical reaction

(3S)-3-hydroxyacyl-CoA  trans-2-enoyl-CoA + H2O

This enzyme belongs to the family of lyases, specifically the hydro-lyases, which cleave carbon-oxygen bonds.  The systematic name of this enzyme class is long-chain-(3S)-3-hydroxyacyl-CoA hydro-lyase. This enzyme is also called long-chain enoyl coenzyme A hydratase.  This enzyme participates in fatty acid elongation in mitochondria and fatty acid metabolism.

References

 
 

EC 4.2.1
Enzymes of unknown structure